Archie Andrews is an American comics character created in 1941.

Archie Andrews may also refer to:

Archie Andrews (puppet), a British ventriloquist's dummy operated by Peter Brough
Archie Andrews (1879–1938), American automobile executive responsible for the Ruxton